James Burwell (March 23, 1898 – September 8, 1974), known as Jim B. or Jimmy B., was one of the Alcoholics Anonymous (AA) founding members.  He was among the first ten members of AA on the East Coast, and was responsible for starting Alcoholics Anonymous in Philadelphia and Baltimore.  Later in life, he and Rosa, his wife, moved to San Diego, California and were instrumental in the growth of AA there.

His most crucial contribution at the founding of AA came from his atheism—or as he later termed it, his "militant agnosticism." He argued strongly with the early group in New York that it needed to tone down what he called the "God bit".  This resulted in the much more inclusive "Higher Power" and "God as we understand Him" concepts that are now so closely associated with Alcoholics Anonymous.  This compromise was crucial—without it, AA would probably not have survived at all, much less have reached the number of people it has worldwide today.  Jim B.'s contribution to Alcoholics Anonymous is considered second only to that of AA's two co-founders, Bill W. and Dr Bob.

He was instrumental in the publication of the all important Saturday Evening Post article by Jack Alexander that first brought nationwide publicity to AA in March 1941. As mentioned by Bill W. in the Twelve Steps and Twelve Traditions (pp. 143 – 145), Jim B. is credited with the adoption of AA's Third Tradition: "The only requirement for A.A. membership is a desire to stop drinking."  In the foreword to the first edition of the book "Alcoholics Anonymous", historically prior to the standardization of the 12 Traditions, it is stated that "the only requirement for membership is an honest desire to stop drinking" [emphasis added]. The long form of the Third Tradition now reads:
Our membership ought to include all who suffer from alcoholism. Hence we may refuse none who wish to recover. Nor ought AA membership ever depend on money or conformity. Any two or three alcoholics gathered together for sobriety may call themselves an AA group, provided that, as a group, they have no other affiliation.

According to Clarence Snyder (an early AA member from Cleveland): "Jimmy remained steadfast, throughout his life and 'preached' his particular [non-God] brand of AA wherever he went."

His story, "The Vicious Cycle," was published in the 2nd, 3rd and 4th edition of the AA Big Book. 

Jim B. is buried in the Christ Episcopal Church cemetery in Owensville, Maryland near his boyhood friend, John Henry Fitzhugh Mayo, known as "Fitz M.", (AA Big Book Story “Our Southern Friend”).  Jim. B. and Fitz M. were among the first members of AA to get and stay sober with Bill W. in New York.

See also 
Alcoholics Anonymous
Twelve-step program
Twelve traditions
Alcoholism
Substance dependence
William Duncan Silkworth

References

Literature 

  ('Big Book')

External links 
 Jim Burwell
 "The Vicious Cycle" Jim Burwell's Biography in AA's 'Big Book', copyright to First and Second Edition expired
 Unofficial Alcoholics Anonymous history site
 Extensive directory of AA pioneers

1898 births
1974 deaths
Alcoholics Anonymous
American agnostics